Montecchia di Crosara is a comune (municipality) in the Province of Verona in the Italian region Veneto, located about  west of Venice and about  northeast of Verona.

Montecchia di Crosara borders the following municipalities: Cazzano di Tramigna, Gambellara, Monteforte d'Alpone, Roncà, San Giovanni Ilarione, and Soave.

Twin towns
Montecchia di Crosara is twinned with:

  Desulo, Italy

References

Cities and towns in Veneto